Tytthoscincus temengorensis, the Temengor forest skink, is a species of skink. It is endemic to Malaysia.

References

temengorensis
Endemic fauna of Malaysia
Reptiles of Malaysia
Reptiles described in 2009
Taxa named by Larry Lee Grismer